Chase T. Rogers (born November 12, 1956) was the Chief Justice of the Connecticut Supreme Court, the second woman to serve in this capacity.  She announced on November 2, 2017, that she would retire in February 2018. She is a graduate of Stanford University and Boston University School of Law.  Rogers is a Connecticut native. She was nominated by Governor M. Jodi Rell and sworn in April 25, 2007, by the first female Chief Justice of the Connecticut Supreme Court, Ellen Ash Peters.  Prior to her nomination, Rogers served in the appellate court of Connecticut from April 2006 to April 2007. Prior to serving on the appellate court, she served as a superior court judge beginning in 1998. Her assignments included serving as the presiding judge for juvenile matters in Bridgeport and being assigned to the regional Child Protection Session in Middletown. Between 2001 and 2005, she was assigned to the Complex Litigation Docket in Stamford, and from 2005 to 2006 she served as the presiding judge for civil matters in the Stamford-Norwalk district. Before becoming a judge, she practiced law for 14 years at Cummings & Lockwood in Stamford, Connecticut. She has two children, a son and a daughter. She was married to Edward Vincent O'Hanlan, a lawyer, on December 21, 1985.

At their 2011 fall commencement ceremony, she was awarded an honorary Doctor of Laws degree from the University of Hartford.

References

See also
 Biographies of Supreme Court Justices at the Connecticut Supreme Court.

1956 births
Boston University School of Law alumni
Chief Justices of the Connecticut Supreme Court
Living people
Stanford University alumni
Women chief justices of state supreme courts in the United States
20th-century American lawyers
20th-century American judges
21st-century American judges
20th-century American women judges
21st-century American women judges